The 1964–65 Texas Tech Red Raiders men's basketball team represented Texas Tech University in the Southwest Conference during the 1964–65 NCAA University Division men's basketball season. The head coach was Gene Gibson, who was in his 4th season with the team. The Red Raiders played their home games in the Lubbock Municipal Coliseum in Lubbock, Texas.

References

Texas Tech Red Raiders basketball seasons
Texas Tech
Texas Tech
Texas Tech